Jackpot is the codename shared by two fictional superheroes, Sara Ehret and Alana Jobson, appearing in American comic books published by Marvel Comics, usually in stories featuring Spider-Man. Created by writer Dan Slott and artist Phil Jimenez, Jackpot's first appearance was in the Free Comic Book Day giveaway Spider-Man: Swing Shift, released on May 5, 2007 and set in the "Brand New Day" storyline.

Publication history
The character Jackpot, first appeared in the Free Comic Book Day issue Spider-Man: Swing Shift released on May 5, 2007 and written by Dan Slott with art by Phil Jimenez. Following the character's debut, Jackpot would appear in several The Amazing Spider-Man related titles before starring in her own mini-series Amazing Spider-Man Presents: Jackpot in 2010.

Fictional character biography

Origin
Sara Ehret, a pregnant scientist at Phelcorp (a subsidiary of Oscorp) works on gene therapy to cure Parkinson's disease when she is accidentally exposed to "Lot 777". The virus rewrote the DNA in her cells leaving her in a coma for 4 months. Coming out of her coma Ehret went on to have her child Madeline with no complications, however when her family came under threat by falling debris she displayed superhuman strength to save them.

Jackpot went on to train and become a government sanctioned Initiative superhero for New York City. Though she served as a crimefighter for a while, Sara Ehret had no desire to remain one, preferring to her normal life and family. When another woman, Alana Jobson, recognized Sara and showed genuine enthusiasm at paying her for the use of Sara's Jackpot identity and license, Sara took the offer and gave up costumed crime fighting.

Alana Jobson
Alana buys Sara's identity, and while the latter goes in hiding, the former starts using a cocktail of enhancement drugs, including Mutant Growth Hormone to grant herself the powers of super-strength, stamina, and invulnerability associated with the Jackpot identity. In denial of her own sexuality, Alana developed a crush on Spider-Man, whom she emulated. She later was revealed to be a lesbian. She had been attracted to Sara but never revealed this to her.

Alana/Jackpot teams up with Spider-Man on a search for the villain Menace. They eventually find her after she attacks a council meeting and kidnaps a councilwoman. Jackpot interferes with the fight between Spider-Man and Menace, pulling Menace from her glider. However, as a result of this action, the glider slams into the rescued councilwoman, killing her. Menace blames Spider-Man for the woman's death and escapes. Jackpot blames herself, as does Spider-Man, as seen in his internal monologue. Still, he attempts to comfort her but Jackpot, who is distraught and angered by the experience, takes it all out on Spider-Man by pushing him away and storming off.

During the 2008 "Secret Invasion" storyline, Jackpot is libelled by Dexter Bennett, current owner of the Daily Bugle and endorser of a series of slanderous articles about her activity as a superhero after she accidentally attacks a meeting of pharmaceutical sales executives whose company has connections to Walter Declun.

Jackpot is furious when she discovers the articles and goes to the Daily Bugle, along with a publicity representative supplied by the Initiative. While there, the newspaper is attacked by a Super-Skrull, who is searching for Spider-Man, and who harbors all of the superhuman abilities of Spider-Man's adversaries the Lizard, Rhino, Electro, Hydro-Man, Sandman, and Venom, Jackpot battles the Super-Skrull in order to allow the Bugle staff to escape, but she is then attacked by Menace. All three combatants are injured by the impact of Jackpot's personal glider vehicle, before Menace escapes. Jackpot defeats the Super-Skrull by freezing him to death inside a freezer.

While fighting Commanda and Blindside, Alana is pumped with the blindness serum used by Blindside to defeat his enemies. Spider-Man comes arrives and administers an antidote to Alana, restoring her vision, but the serum's interaction with the drugs that gave her superhuman powers, results in a fatal side effect in Alana, who dies shortly.

Sara Ehret reclaims the identity
Investigating Jackpot's identity, Spider-Man goes to what he believes is Jackpot's house only to find Sara Ehret, who tells him she is not the superheroine Jackpot (Alana Jobson), and sends Spider-Man away, saying he "really should keep out of this."

Later, Spider-Man, having already discovered the whole truth about Alana and Sara, goes to notify Sara about Alana's death, blaming Sara for evading her responsibilities and allowing the otherwise powerless and untrained Alana to go to her doom. Sara is left clutching Jackpot's costume, while Spider-Man walks away, after telling her that people with powers do not have a choice of giving up their responsibilities.

Distraught, Sara reclaims her heroic identity and later comes into conflict with Boomerang and, a new Rose, who learn her identity. Under Rose's orders, Boomerang tracks Sara down at her house and murders her husband in front of her and her daughter.

Sara gets revenge and unmasks the Rose, but is forced to change her, and her daughter's, identity, taking the name Alana Jobson.

Powers and abilities
While the first Jackpot had superhuman powers, the second and more prominent Jackpot's powers are derived from drugs that she took for physical enhancement. She has demonstrated dramatic gymnastic ability. In The Amazing Spider-Man #549, she says she has some invulnerability. She is shown to have some limited fighting ability. The abilities shown are consistent with the abilities produced by Mutant Growth Hormone users, and she requires continued use of the substance to maintain them.

Jackpot also exhibited superhuman strength, as in Secret Invasion Spider-Man #2 she was able to rip the trunk off of a car and throw it into a Super Skrull. In the same issue she withstood some serious punches at the hands of super powered Skrull warrior without developing bruises, which confirms her previous claims about possessing some sort of invulnerability.

Costume and identity
The identity of the character was kept secret and became part of her storyline during the year following after her first appearance. She shared many characteristics with the Spider-Man supporting character Mary Jane Watson; long red hair, and a tendency to use the pet term "Tiger", a nickname used by Watson for Peter Parker (Spider-Man) and others on many occasions. Parker himself suspects Jackpot may be Mary Jane and even the name "Jackpot" itself echoes Mary Jane Watson's classic line, spoken in her first full appearance: "Face it Tiger, you just hit the jackpot".

Jackpot (Alana Jobson) also used money from a modeling shoot (Watson was a model) to pay for a police scanner to use in her heroic persona, though she strictly denies it, telling him her real name is "Sara Ehret".

Sara Ehret would eventually be revealed to be Jackpot's original identity. but not before approaching Mary Jane at an airport for an autograph. Sara claims to be "a huge fan" of Mary Jane and mentions her famous "jackpot" line, which Mary Jane has since made famous by saying it in a soap opera. The two women are shown side by side and despite different hair styles, have very similar faces.

Originally sporting a disco-era costume, Jackpot wore a green jumpsuit with bell bottoms, gold cuffs, a silver stripe running down the front, and a gold mask that covers her eyes, side of her face, and apparently wraps behind her head. She also wore a belt with the numbers 777 on it, referring to the substance that gave her powers. Though not initially considered as a part of her costume, Jackpot's long red hair is revealed to be a wig.

She later changes the costume to a red and black version and the Jackpot name is then associated with the substance that gave her powers ("We thought we'd hit the Jackpot").

In other media
Sony announced that a Jackpot film is in development for Sony's Spider-Man Universe. By May 2020 Marc Guggenheim, who had previously written the character's comics, was hired as screenwriter for the project and may possibly also direct as well.

Collected editions

References

Marvel Comics characters with superhuman strength
Marvel Comics sidekicks
Comics characters introduced in 2007
Marvel Comics female superheroes
Marvel Comics LGBT superheroes
Marvel Comics martial artists
Marvel Comics mutates
Spider-Man characters
Fictional lesbians
Characters created by Dan Slott